The Wellington Cable Car is a funicular railway in Wellington, New Zealand, between Lambton Quay, the main shopping street, and Kelburn, a suburb in the hills overlooking the central city, rising  over a length of .

The one way trip takes approximately five minutes. The Wellington Cable Car is widely recognised as a symbol of Wellington.

Track and stations
The only curves are at the passing loop in the middle, at Talavera station. Except for the lowest part the line rises at a constant grade of 1 in 5.06 (17.86% or 10.13 degrees), through three tunnels and over three bridges.

The lower terminus is in Cable Car Lane, off Lambton Quay. The upper terminus is next to the Wellington Botanic Garden at the city end of Upland Road, Kelburn's main street.

Cars and propulsion

The Cable Car has two cars, which start from opposite ends of the line and pass in the middle. They are attached to each other by a 30 mm diameter cable, supported by 120 rollers, which runs round a pulley at the top of the hill. A 185 kW 550 V DC motor at the top of the hill drives the pulley. The Cable Car is a funicular rather than a true cable car: the cars are permanently attached to the cable, which stops and starts as required, while a cable car grips and releases a continuously-moving cable. Wheels on the south side of car 1 and the north side of car 2 have double flanges, while the opposite wheels on each car have no flanges, directing the cars to the correct side of the mid-way passing loop at Talavera.

The cars are designed to fit the grade, using internal steps to provide horizontal floors.

Each car weighs approximately  when empty and  when full.

Passengers
The Cable Car is used by slightly under a million people each year. In the mornings and evenings, it is used by commuters travelling between Kelburn and the city; at other times of the day, it is used by people travelling between the city and the Wellington Botanic Garden, by students attending Victoria University and living in nearby student hostels, and by many tourists, especially during summer.

Ownership
The Cable Car is owned and operated by Wellington Cable Car Ltd, owned by Wellington City Council. Wellington Cable Car Ltd also owns the overhead wires for Wellington's trolleybuses. Operation was contracted out to Australian company Transfield Services until early 2007, when it was brought back in-house. Wellington Cable Car Ltd is responsible for all operations of the Cable Car, including the maintenance of cars and track, employing drivers, selling tickets and providing customer service. Unlike buses and trains, the Cable Car does not receive a subsidy, and is profitable.

Museum
The Cable Car Museum was opened in December 2000. Located in the original winding house, and with a new extension completed in 2006, it houses original grip cars 1 and 3, with the electric winding gear still in working order. Car 1 is in red 1970s livery, including contemporary advertising. Car 3 was restored in 2005 to a green livery dating from about 1905, and a bell from the San Francisco Cable Car was added. The winding gear is still in working order and runs a loop of cable, but the cable no longer leaves the building.

The Cable Car Museum is operated by the Wellington Museums Trust. It has a Category II listing with Heritage New Zealand.

History

The original line
At the end of the 19th century, Wellington was expanding rapidly, and, due to the city's hilly terrain, good building land was at a premium. When new residential developments were proposed for Kelburn, it was suggested that a cable car or funicular could be built to provide easy access. In 1898, a number of people prominent in the development of the residential subdivisions founded the Kelburne & Karori Tramway Company. The plan was to build a tramway between the city and Kelburn, and link it by carriage to Karori, a settlement on the far side of Kelburn. The company began purchasing land for the construction of the tramway and negotiated with the Karori authorities for a new road (now Upland Road) to link the upper terminus with Karori. In 1898, the City Council granted permission for the venture, on the condition that it had the option to purchase the operation at a later date. The location of Victoria University of Wellington was influenced by the company's offer of a donation of £1000 if the university were located in Kelburn, so students would patronise the car when travelling between the city and the university. Several of the Company investors like Martin Kennedy were supporters of Seddon, who stalled on releasing land on the alternative Mount Cook Gaol site for the university, although this site was widely supported in Wellington.

The designer of the system was James Fulton, a Dunedin-born engineer. Fulton was responsible for both selecting the route and deciding the method of operation, a hybrid between a cable car and a funicular. Like a cable car, the line had a continuous loop haulage cable that the cars gripped using a cable car gripper, but it also had a funicular-style balance cable permanently attached to both cars over an undriven pulley at the top of the line. The descending car gripped the haulage cable and was pulled downhill, in turn pulling the ascending car (which remained ungripped) uphill by the balance cable. There was a Fell type centre rail, used for emergency braking only. The line was double track, of  gauge.

Construction began in 1899, involving three teams working around the clock. The line opened to the public on 22 February 1902. Demand was high, with thousands of people travelling each day. In 1903, a number of old horse-drawn Wellington trams were converted into cable car trailers, increasing capacity. By 1912, the annual number of passengers had reached one million. In 1933, the steam-powered winding gear was replaced by an electric motor, improving control and reducing operating costs.

In the 1940s, the Cable Car suffered from increased competition: City Council buses ran to Karori and other western suburbs, bypassing it. The company believed that it was inappropriate for the City Council to compete with a private company, and a legal dispute broke out. The argument ended when the City Council agreed to purchase the company, which occurred on 13 February 1947.

In the 1960s and 1970s, the Cable Car was the subject of complaints about safety and comfort. The old wooden cars were increasingly considered antiquated. On 10 May 1973, a worker on the new motorway suffered serious injuries in an accident when he stepped in front of a Cable Car at the Clifton stop, prompting a review. The Ministry of Works concluded that aspects of the Cable Car were unsafe, particularly the use of unbraked trailers, and called for the system to be scrapped. The trailers were withdrawn, considerably reducing capacity.

1978–79 upgrade
Despite public protests led by Mayor of Wellington Michael Fowler, the line closed on 22 September 1978 for re-gauging and installation of new steel cars and equipment by Habegger AG of Switzerland, becoming a full funicular. The contract was managed by Wellington engineering firm Cory-Wright and Salmon. The line re-opened on 22 October 1979.

Initially, the refurbished Cable Car suffered a number of problems. The service was frequently interrupted for technical reasons and for extensive safety checks. Largely as a result of these problems, patronage dropped to a low of 500,000 in 1982. After a serious accident in 1988, which put the cars out of service for months, the system underwent a major revamp. This solved most of the problems and patronage has steadily increased since then. A safety survey is conducted annually at the end of October and takes four days.

Deregulation
In 1991, when passenger transport was deregulated, there was speculation about the future of the Cable Car. Councils could no longer provide transport services directly, having to either privatise or corporatise their operations. The City Council sold its bus operation, but due to public pressure it retained ownership of the Cable Car and the trolleybus overhead wiring, with operations and maintenance contracted out separately.

Initially both contracts were won by Harbour City Cable Car Ltd, a joint venture between the Stagecoach Group, which had purchased the buses, and East by West, a Wellington ferry operator. In 1994, the City Council decided to carry out its own maintenance, and Wellington Cable Car Ltd established its own maintenance capacity. In 1997, the operations contract was won by Serco, which was later purchased by Transfield Services. Wellington Cable Car Ltd took the operation in-house in early 2007.

Cracks were discovered in the tunnel below Talavera station during the 1999 Annual survey. These were fixed with metal anchoring and by coating the tunnel with reinforced concrete.

In July 2006, renovation of Lambton station began, to improve its looks and accessibility. The works were budgeted at $1.3 million, scheduled to be completed in early November. On 18 December the renovated station came into use, with automated turnstiles (and a substantial price rise). Lingering problems with the ticketing system upgrade were fixed during the October 2007 annual survey. A new computer was also added to the winding mechanism during the survey which has caused a few temporary issues with how smoothly the cars run.

2016 electric drive and control system upgrade

In 2016, the Cable Car underwent a major equipment upgrade to replace the electric drive and control system. Since the 1979 upgrade, each car has completed more than one million trips. The Cable Car also took the opportunity to cosmetically upgrade the existing cars and make changes to the staff facilities.

Whilst the Cable Car was out of action, the Wellington City Council also carried out construction work in the Cable Car Lane and Lambton Quay Terminal. This included: 
1. replacing the old leaky canopy with an elegant new glass one that will let the sunshine in (Phase 1)
2. building a new ticket booth and moving the entry gates to make queuing and buying tickets easier (Phase 1)
3. new paving, signs and colour scheme for the heritage-listed Stonehams building (Phase 2 – final phase of work on the lane in 2017)

2022 bird strike prevention 
In March 2022, the windows of the Kelburn terminal building were fitted with decals to help prevent bird strike, as a wildlife conservation measure.  The initiative was partly funded through crowd-sourcing undertaken by a local conservation organisation, the Urban Wildlife Trust.

Trivia
The landmark Kelburn Kiosk was built at the Kelburn terminal in 1905. It was burnt down in a suspicious fire in 1982. The Skyline Restaurant was built to replace it in 1984.

On 24 February 1909, John William Wakelin, aged 30, was accidentally killed by the tram.

See also 
 Trams in New Zealand
 Cable car (railway)
 Funicular
 List of funicular railways
 San Francisco cable car system
 Peak Tram

References

Citations

Bibliography

 Burdett, Ron E. (1979) C.Eng, M.I.Mech.E. "The Wellington cable cars", New Zealand Engineering, 34 (4), 15 April, p. 83–88 (by the Transport Engineer, Wellington City Council).
 
 
 New Zealand—Cemetery Transcriptions, 1840–1981 [Part A] [MMS5-XPR] John William Wakelin

External links

 Wellington Cable Car site
 IPENZ Engineering Heritage Register: Wellington Cable Car
 Wellington Cable Car Museum
 History of the Kelburn Cable Car
 Image of MOW report, Diagram of Cable Car 
 The business consortium that built the Cable Car, the Kelly Gang
 
 

Funicular railways in New Zealand
Metre gauge railways in New Zealand
Cable Car
Rail transport in Wellington
Wellington City
Tourist attractions in Wellington City
Railway lines opened in 1902
Wellington Central, Wellington